Luiz Carlos Santos or simply Deleu (born March 1, 1984 in Penedo) is a Brazilian footballer, who currently plays for Jaguar Gdańsk in the Polish IV liga. In March 2017, Deleu was granted Polish citizenship.

Career
In July 2010, he signed a two-year contract with the Polish Ekstraklasa side Lechia Gdańsk. He played there for four seasons, until the end of the 2013–14 season. On August 5, 2014, he signed a two-year contract with Cracovia. On January 9, 2018, he terminated the contract with Cracovia. On February 17, 2018, he signed a six-month contract with Miedź Legnica, where he played only one league match.

In the following years, he represented the colors of Chojniczanka Chojnice and Bytovia Bytów. In January 2021, he terminated the contract with Bytovia and became a Jaguar Gdańsk player. At the same time, he started working as a junior coach at the club's academy.

References

External links 
 
 

1984 births
Living people
Brazilian footballers
Brazilian expatriate footballers
Expatriate footballers in Poland
Brazilian expatriate sportspeople in Poland
Ekstraklasa players
I liga players
II liga players
Sport Club Corinthians Alagoano players
Associação Desportiva Confiança players
Clube Náutico Capibaribe players
Centro Sportivo Alagoano players
Clube Atlético Metropolitano players
Ceará Sporting Club players
Mirassol Futebol Clube players
Treze Futebol Clube players
Lechia Gdańsk players
MKS Cracovia (football) players
Miedź Legnica players
Chojniczanka Chojnice players
Association football defenders
Naturalized citizens of Poland